Daeseong-ri Station is a railway station on the Gyeongchun Line.

Metro stations in Gapyeong County
Seoul Metropolitan Subway stations
Railway stations opened in 1939